Chamois is a town and comune in the Aosta Valley region of northwestern Italy.

Chamois is the only municipality in Italy not reachable by motorized vehicles. Visitors can access Chamois by cable car or via a walking path originating at La Magdeleine.

Gallery

References

External links
 
 Alpine Pearls

Cities and towns in Aosta Valley